USS Brooke (FFG-1) was the lead ship of her class of guided missile frigates in the United States Navy from 1962 to 1988. She was named for John Mercer Brooke. As of 2021, no other ship in the United States Navy has been named Brooke.

Laid down on 19 December 1962 by Lockheed Ship Building, Brooke was launched on 19 July 1963 and commissioned on 12 March 1966. Originally designated DEG-1, she was redesignated FFG-1 in 1975. She served in the Pacific Fleet and was homeported in San Diego, California.

Pakistan service

Following decommissioning in 1988, she was transferred to Pakistan on 1 February 1989. Renamed Khaibar, she was returned to the United States on 14 November 1993 and sold for scrap on 29 March 1994.

Ship awards
Navy Meritorious Unit Commendation (2)
Navy Battle "E" Ribbon
National Defense Service Medal
Armed Forces Expeditionary Medal
Vietnam Service Medal (6)
Navy Sea Service Deployment Ribbon
Republic of Vietnam Campaign Medal

References

External links

Photo of Brooke
DANFS – Brooke
 

Brooke-class frigates
Cold War frigates and destroyer escorts of the United States
Ships built by Lockheed Shipbuilding and Construction Company
1963 ships